Leinster Senior League may refer to:

 Leinster Senior League (rugby union)   
 Leinster Senior League (association football)
 Leinster Senior League (cricket)